Keshav Rao Jadhav was an activist for separate state of Telangana. He is now the convener of Telangana Jana Parishad.

Early life and career 
Keshav Rao Jadhav was the president of Osmania University Teachers Association before he got retired as the Professor in English Department of Osmania University. He was actively involved in the separate Telangana movement in 1969 and was also associated with the People's Union of Civil Liberties.

He stood for the dialogue with the Maoists to end violence. He worked closely with socialist leader Ram Manohar Lohia.
 He calls himself Mr. Telangana. He is the participant in Mulki War held in 1953, while he was studying in Nizam college.

References

3.https://www.deccanchronicle.com/nation/current-affairs/170618/telangana-statehood-activist-keshav-rao-jadhav-passes-away.html

Activists from Telangana
Living people
1933 births